Not Yet New York was a Los Angeles, California political organization in the 1980s.  Its goals were to slow the growth of the city, and preserve open space and low density.  Founded by Laura Lake, a UCLA professor, and Barbara Blinderman, an attorney, it played a major part in the passage of Los Angeles's Proposition U. It is now mostly disbanded.

References
LA Weekly article "Rebel With A Plan" by Robert Greene, published on November 18, 2004—provides a source for the connection with Proposition U, activity in the 80s, organization's goals, and "importance" of the group.
Article in the Los Angeles Daily News titled "L.A. denser than N.Y." published on July 14, 2001, written by Beth Barrett. "Lake, who co-founded "Not Yet New York," a largely defunct group that pressed for city charter reform," -- verifies "mostly disbanded", and one of the founders.
"Not Yet New York" entry in Los Angeles A to Z: An Encyclopedia of the City and County written by Leonard and Dale Pitt, published by UC Press in 1997. -- verifies founders names and professions, organization's goals, activity in 80s.

Political advocacy groups in the United States
Organizations based in Los Angeles